(born October 22, 1969, as ), better known by her ring name , is a retired Japanese professional wrestler who mostly wrestled for JWP Joshi Puroresu. In 1990 she was featured in an all female wrestling game based on her titled Cutie Suzuki no Ringside Angel. Outside of wrestling she also took on numerous acting roles.

Professional wrestling career
On December 1, 1992, JWP Joshi Puroresu (JWP) introduced the JWP Openweight Championship, when Dynamite Kansai defeated Suzuki in a tournament final to become the inaugural champion.

In November 1994, Suzuki competed at All Japan Women's Pro-Wrestling event Big Egg Wrestling Universe. At the event, Megumi Kudo and Hikari Fukuoka defeated Suzuki and Takako Inoue.

In 1995 at World Championship Wrestling (WCW)'s World War 3 pay-per-view, Suzuki and Mayumi Ozaki were defeated by Bull Nakano and Akira Hokuto (accompanied by Sonny Onoo) in a tag team match. The teams also competed the following night on Nitro.

Other media
Suzuki voiced the character Iczer-3 in the animated series Iczer Reborn. She also appeared in the films The Ninja Dragon and Battle Girl: The Living Dead in Tokyo Bay. The video game Cutie Suzuki no Ringside Angel for Sega Mega Drive is named after Suzuki.

Championships and accomplishments 
Japan Women's Pro-Wrestling
 JWP Junior Championship (1 time)
 UWA Women's Junior Championship (1 time)
JWP Joshi Puroresu
 JWP Tag Team Championship (5 times) - with Mayumi Ozaki (2), Dynamite Kansai (2), and Devil Masami (1)

References

1969 births
Living people
Sportspeople from Saitama Prefecture
Japanese female professional wrestlers